Johannes Lello (25 November 1895 – 26 November 1976) was an Estonian footballer. He played in three matches for the Estonia national football team in 1924. Lello was part of the Estonian team at the 1924 Summer Olympics in Paris.

References

External links
 

1895 births
1976 deaths
Estonian footballers
Estonia international footballers
Association football defenders
JK Tallinna Kalev players
Olympic footballers of Estonia
Sportspeople from Jõgeva
Footballers at the 1924 Summer Olympics